Dome Mountain may refer to:

 Dome mountain, a geological term
 Dome Mountain, a mountain peak in British Columbia
 Dome Mountain (Colorado), high mountain summit
 Dome Mountain (Hot Springs County, Wyoming), a mountain peak in Shoshone National Forest, Wyoming
 Dome Mountain (Wyoming), a mountain peak in Yellowstone National Park, Wyoming
 Dome Mountain (Toonumbar), one of several mountains in Australia called Dome Mountain
 Castle Dome Mountains, a mountain range in Arizona
 Black Dome Mountain, a mountain peak in British Columbia
 Puy de Dôme, is a large lave dome in France
 Carter Dome, a mountain peak in New Hampshire
 Dome Rock Mountains, a mountain range in Arizona
 Dome Mountain (Los Angeles County), near Pyramid Lake